Klomp is a Dutch surname. In most cases it is a metonymic occupational surname, originally referring to a klomp maker. Variant (plural) forms of the surname are Klompe and Klompen. To make this surname of humble origin more distinct, some families added an accent (Klompé), as if the name had a French origin.
People with this name include:

 Albert Jansz. Klomp (1625–1688), Dutch landscape and animal painter
 Bart Klomp (born 1999), Dutch curler
 Birgit Klomp (born 1940), German freestyle swimmer
 Carmen Klomp-Wearne (born 1975), Australian rower
 Daan Klomp (born 1998), Dutch football defender
  (1865–1946), Dutch-born German architect
 Nick Klomp, Australian academic administrator
 René Klomp (born 1974), Dutch football midfielder
 Robbert Klomp (born 1955), Australian rules football player

Klompe / Klompé
 Marga Klompé (1912–1986), Dutch KVP politician; government minister from 1956 to 1971
 Tieme Klompe (born 1976), Dutch football defender
 Theodorus Klompe (1903–1963), Dutch geologist in South East Asia

See also 
 De Klomp, neighborhood of Ede, Netherlands

References 

Dutch-language surnames
Occupational surnames